Dimitar Pechikamakov (born 24 June 1963), is a former Bulgarian association football midfielder, who is most notable for appearing in an all-time record 444 league matches for his hometown football club Lokomotiv GO, also contributing for the squad with 86 goals.

Club career
Pechikamakov contributed 27 goals in 216 matches while playing top flight football in Bulgaria. He was also part of the team of Lokomotiv GO, which reached the semi-finals of the 1986-87 Bulgarian Cup.

References

1963 births
Living people
Bulgarian footballers
First Professional Football League (Bulgaria) players
FC Lokomotiv Gorna Oryahovitsa players
FC Dunav Ruse players
Association football midfielders
People from Gorna Oryahovitsa
Sportspeople from Veliko Tarnovo Province